Breathing Under Water is an Australian film, the first feature from Director and writer Susan Dermody.

Plot 
Dermody's Breathing Under Water is tale of a main character named Beatrice who traveled to a mythical city deep in the ocean.

References

External links
 Breathing Under Water at Australian Screen Online
 
 Breathing Under Water at Oz Movies

Australian drama films
1991 films
1991 directorial debut films
1990s English-language films
1990s Australian films